Edison Elementary School is the name of many primary schools, with most of them named after Thomas Edison. They include:

Edison Elementary school (Alameda California) 
Edison Elementary School (Ontario, California)
Edison Elementary School (Long Beach, California)
Edison Elementary School (Glendale, California)
Edison Elementary School (Santa Ana, California)
Edison Elementary School (Torrance, California)
Edison Elementary School (Denver, Colorado)
Edison Elementary School (Hammond, Indiana)
Edison Elementary School (Kankakee, Illinois)
Edison Elementary School (Fraser, Michigan)
Thomas A. Edison School (Union City, New Jersey)
Edison Elementary School (Minot, North Dakota)
Edison Elementary School (Ashland, Ohio) 
Edison Elementary School (Eugene, Oregon)
Edison Elementary School (Edison, Washington)
Edison Elementary School (Tacoma, Washington)
Edison Elementary school (Phoenix Arizona) 
Thomas A. Edison Elementary School (Fort Gratiot, Michigan)

Edison Elementary School (Dayton, Ohio)